Poison Years is a compilation album by Bob Mould, who had been the guitarist and co-vocalist of the influential American rock band Hüsker Dü. It is essentially a condensed version of Mould's first two solo albums on Virgin Records, Workbook (1989) and Black Sheets of Rain (1990), and was released in mid-1994 after Mould had achieved considerable success with his new band Sugar. It contains 6 (out of 11) studio tracks from Black Sheets and 5 (out of 11) tracks from Workbook, of which 3 are previously unreleased live versions. In addition, the album contains a studio outtake from the Workbook period, "All Those People Know", a live version of another non-album track, "If You're True", and a live cover version of "Shoot Out The Lights" from the eponymous 1982 album by Richard and Linda Thompson.

Track listing 
"Black Sheets Of Rain" — 7:40 from Black Sheets of Rain (1990)
"It's Too Late" — 4:01 from Black Sheets of Rain (1990)
"Stop Your Crying" — 4:29 from Black Sheets of Rain (1990)
"Out Of Your Life" — 3:32 from Black Sheets of Rain (1990)
"Hanging Tree" — 5:44 from Black Sheets of Rain (1990)
"Sacrifice / Let There Be Peace" — 5:33 from Black Sheets of Rain (1990)
"Wishing Well" — 5:11 from Workbook (1989)   
"See A Little Light" — 3:31 from Workbook (1989)   
"All Those People Know" — 3:38 outtake from Workbook (1989)
"Compositions For The Young And Old" (Live) — 4:19 original on Workbook (1989)   
"If You're True" (Live) — 4:34 previously unreleased
"Poison Years" (Live) — 5:40 original on Workbook (1989)   
"Brasilia Crossed With Trenton" (Live) — 7:09 original on Workbook (1989)    
"Shoot Out The Lights" (Live) — 5:55 original on Shoot Out The Lights by Richard and Linda Thompson (1982)

All tracks written by Bob Mould, except track 14, written by Richard Thompson.
Tracks 1-9 produced by Bob Mould, tracks 10-14 produced by Timothy Powell, mixed by Bob Mould.

Personnel
Bob Mould – vocals, guitar, mandolin, keyboards, percussion
Tony Maimone – bass guitar
Anton Fier – drums
Jane Scarpantoni – cello
Chris Stamey – rhythm guitar & backing vocals (live tracks)
Steven Haigler – percussion (Workbook studio tracks)

References 

1994 compilation albums
Bob Mould albums
Albums produced by Bob Mould
Virgin Records compilation albums